Olga Anisimova (Russian Ольга Викторовна Анисимова; *January 29, 1972) is a former Russian biathlete.

Career 
Anisimova started her career competing for the USSR at the Biathlon Youth and Junior World Championships between 1988 and 1991. Her Biathlon World Cup debut came during the 1991-92 Biathlon World Cup season in the individual in Hochfilzen, Austria. She competed during the 1993-94 Biathlon World Cup season. However, she was out of the A-Team following the 1995-96 Biathlon World Cup season, making a comeback a decade later during the 2006-07 Biathlon World Cup season.

She made her way back into the Russian A-Team thanks to great results in the European Cup when she won the overall title during the 2005–06 season. At the 2004 Biathlon Open European Championships in Minsk, Belarus, she won a gold medal with the Russian relay. Two years later in Arber, Germany, she won two silver medals in the sprint and pursuit.

Her best ever result in the World Cup came during the 2007-08 Biathlon World Cup where, at the age of 35, she finished second in the Oberhof, Germany mass start, behind Magdalena Neuner. Her best finish in the overall came a season earlier when she finished 21st.

World Championships

*During Olympic seasons competitions are only held for those events not included in the Olympic program.
**Team was removed as an event in 1998, and pursuit was added in 1997 with mass start being added in 1999 and the mixed relay in 2005.

References

External links
 

1972 births
Russian female biathletes
Living people
People from Balakovo
Sportspeople from Saratov Oblast